DHC Slavia Prague the Czech women's handball section of Czech omnisport club SK Slavia Prague. It was established in 1919. They are currently competing in the MOL Liga and the Czech Women's Handball League.

The team won four Czechoslovak championships between 1926 and 1935. In 1960 Slavia, which had its name changed to Dynamo Prague between 1949 and 1965, won its fifth title and became the first team to represent Czechoslovakia in the newly founded European Cup where it reached the final, losing to Stiinta Bucharest. Three decades later the team won two of the last three editions of the Czechoslovak championship. 

Following the dissolution of Czechoslovakia Slavia has competed in the Czech First Division and, from 2002, in the WHIL, a supranational league comprised by the leading Czech and Slovak clubs. The team won seven Czech championships between 1994 and 2010, and it has also won the WHIL in 2010 and 2011. Its major international success in the modern era was reaching the semifinals of the EHF Cup in 2001.

Titles
 Czechoslovak Championship
 1926, 1929, 1933, 1935, 1960, 1991, 1993
 WHIL
 2010, 2011
 Czech First Division
 1994, 1999, 2000, 2001, 2002, 2007, 2010

European record

Team

Current squad
Squad for the 2022–23 season

Goalkeepers
 1  Vendula Vrbková
 27  Michaela Malá
 33  Petra Kudláčková
 88  Martina Koudelková
Wingers
LW
8  Tereza Mulacová
 13  Vendula Frycáková
 22  Eliška Jirásková
 24  Barbora Doležalová
RW
 5  Nikola Motejlová
 26  Nikola Švihnosová
Line players 
 15  Adéla Zimová
 19  Adriana Míšová
 38  Barbora Vavroušková

Back players
LB
 9  Tereza Vostárková
 10  Adéla Novotná
 30  Martina Weisenbilderová
CB
 4  Julie Franková
 7  Alexandra Koubová
 25  Iulia Stefan Borcan
 44  Katarina Mydlová
 77  Adéla Mazánková
RB
 17  Veronika Duranková

Transfers 
Transfers for the 2023–24 season

 Joining

 Leaving

Staff members
Staff for the 2022-23 season.
  Head Coach: Jan Salač
  Assistant Coach: Petra Freislerová
  Team Leader: Jana Vasilevová
  Physiotherapist: Klára Nožičková
  Physiotherapist: Dušan Kužehuba

References

SK Slavia Prague
Slavia Prague Handball
Slavia Prague
Handball clubs established in 1919
1919 establishments in Czechoslovakia